The Chesley Award for Best Art Director is given by the Association of Science Fiction and Fantasy Artists (ASFA) to recognize the achievements of a science fiction or fantasy art director eligible in the year previous to the award.

Winners and nominees

References

External links
 The Chesley Award section of the ASFA website
 Locus Index to SF Awards: Chesley Awards 2006

Art Director
Science fiction awards